Wright is an occupational surname originating in England. The term 'Wright' comes from the circa 700 AD Old English word 'wryhta' or 'wyrhta', meaning worker or shaper of wood. Later it became any occupational worker (for example, a shipwright is a person who builds ships), and is used as a British family name.

The word's use as an occupational title continued until the mid-19th century, often combined with other words such as in shipwright, wheelwright, wainwright and playwright. , Wright was the eleventh most common surname in England.

The word carpentier, now "carpenter", was introduced into England in the years after the Norman conquest in 1066 and slowly replaced the traditional name and meaning of wright in most of England. 'Wright' is still used in Scottish English in the original meaning of 'skilled woodworker'. The Incorporation of Wrights of the Trades House of Glasgow, and the Incorporation of Wrights and Masons of Edinburgh Trades retain the word in its original meaning in their role of promoting the woodworking trade.

Wright is also an anglicised version of the Scots Gaelic clan name "MacIntyre" or "Mac an t-Saoir", meaning "son of the wright" (son of the carpenter).
In Ireland, the native Gaelic Mac an Cheairt sept of County Mayo occasionally changed their name to Wright. This is a literal translation meaning, "son of the right or righteous".

Notable people with the surname "Wright" include

A
Ab Wright (1905–1995), American football and baseball player
Abbie J. Wright (1862–??), American singer
Abraham Wright (born 1984), American football player
Abraham Wright (deacon) (1611–1690), English theologian and deacon
Ada Wright (1862–1939), English suffragist
Adrian Wright (1947–2015), English-Australian actor
A. Gilbert Wright (1909–1987), American zoologist
Akanbi Wright, Nigerian musician
Akil Wright (born 1996), English footballer
Alexandra Wright, English rabbi
Alexis Wright (born 1950), Aboriginal Australian writer
Alexsandra Wright (born 1971), Canadian actress
Alfred Wright (1848–1909), Anglican priest
Alfred Wright (missionary) (1788–1853), American minister
Allan Wright (1920–2015), English pilot
Allan Wright (farmer) (1929–2022), New Zealand businessman
Allen Wright (1826–1885), American native chief
Allen Wright (journalist) (1932–1997), Scottish art critic and journalist
Almroth Wright (1861–1947), British immunologist
Aloma Wright (born 1950), American actress
Alonzo Wright (1821–1894), Canadian businessman and politician
Alphonse Wright (1887–1953), Belgian footballer
Alvin Wright (1961–2018), American football player
Ambrose R. Wright (1826–1872), American army general
Amos Wright (1809–1886), Canadian politician
Amra-Faye Wright (born 1960), South African actress
Andre Wright (born 1996), English footballer
Andwuelle Wright (born 1997), Trinidadian long jumper
Angela Wright, English businesswoman
Ann Wright (born 1947), American colonel
Annemarie Wright (born 1979), English artist
Anton Wright (born 1974), British adventurer
Antonia Wright (born 1979), American artist
Apollo Wright, American football coach
April Wright, American writer
Arin Wright (born 1992), American soccer player
Arlaine Wright, Canadian exercise instructor
Aron Wright (1810–1885), American physician and educator
Asher Wright (1803–1875), American missionary

B
Bagley Wright (1924–2011), American philanthropist
Bailey Wright (born 1992), Australian footballer
Barrie Wright (born 1945), English footballer
Barry Wright (born 1939), English footballer
Basil Wright (1907–1987), English filmmaker
Beals Wright (1871–1961), American tennis player
Beatrice Wright (1910–2003), American-born British politician
Beatrice Wright (psychologist) (1917–2018), American psychologist
Bernard Wright (1963–2022), American musician
Bernie Wright (born 1954), British footballer
Berny Wright (born 1979), Costa Rican footballer
Bertha Wright (1876–1971), American nurse
Bertie Wright (1871–1960), British actor
Bertie Wright (cricketer) (1897–1955), English cricketer
Bessie Wright, Scottish healer
Betsey Wright (born 1943), American political consultant
Betty Wright (1953–2020), American singer
Betty Ren Wright (1927–2013), American writer
Beverly Wright, American environmentalist
Blanche Fisher Wright (1887–1971), American illustrator
Bonnie Wright (born 1991), English actress
Boomer Wright, American politician
Bracey Wright (born 1984), American basketball player
Brandon Wright (born 1997), American football player
Brent Wright (born 1978), American basketball player
Bricktop Wright (1908–1972), American baseball player
Brock Wright (born 1998), American football player
Broderick Wright (born 1987), Australian rugby league footballer
Bryant Wright, American minister

C
Caesar Wright (1904–1967), Canadian jurist
Caleb Wright (1810–1898), English mill owner and politician
Caleb Merrill Wright (1908–2001), American judge
Callum Wright (born 2000), English footballer
Calvin E. Wright (1908–1988), American politician
Camille Wright (born 1955), American swimmer
Campbell Wright (born 2002), New Zealand biathlete
Carolann Wright, Canadian politician
Carolyne Wright (born 1949), American poet
Carroll D. Wright (1840–1909), American statistician
Casey Wright (born 1981), American horse trainer
Casey Wright (skier) (born 1994), Australian skier
Cathie Wright (1929–2012), American politician
C. Conrad Wright (1917–2011), American religious historian
Cedric Wright (1889–1959), American violinist
Cesare Wright, American filmmaker
Chad Wright (born 1991), Jamaican discus thrower
Chalky Wright (1912–1957), American boxer
Chantal Wright (born 1993), American judoka
Carleton H. Wright (1892–1973), American admiral
Chatt G. Wright (born 1941), American academic administrator
Chauncey Wright (1830–1875), American philosopher and mathematician
Chely Wright (born 1970), American singer
Chuck Wright (born 1959), American bassist
Cindy Wright (born 1972), Belgian-American painter
C. Kelly Wright, American actress
Clare Wright (born 1969), American-Australian historian
Clarissa Dickson Wright (1947–2014), English chef
Claud William Wright (1917–2010), British paleontologist
Claudia Wright (1934–2005), Australian journalist
Clay Wright, American kayaker
Clive Wright (born 1965), Jamaican sprinter
Clyde Wright (born 1941), American baseball player
Clyde J. Wright (1878–??), American editor
Clymer Wright (1932–2011), American activist
Cobina Wright (1887–1970), American singer and actress
Cobina Wright Jr. (1921–2011), American singer and actress
Colin William Wright (1867–1952), Australian cattle breeder
Conroy Wright (born 1985), Caymanian cricketer
Courtney Wright (born 1994), Northern Irish lawn bowler
Cowley Wright (1889–1923), English actor
Crispin Wright (born 1942), British philosopher
C. S. Wright (1887–1975), Canadian explorer
Curtis Wright (born 1955), American musician
Curtis Wright IV (born 1949), American medical consultant
Cuthbert Wright (1892–1948), American poet
Cy Wright (1893–1947), American baseball player

D
Damien Wright (born 1975), Australian cricketer
Dana Wright (born 1959), Canadian hurdler
Daphne Wright (born 1963), Irish visual artist
Dare Wright (1914–2001), Canadian writer
Darnell Wright (born 2001), American football player
Darrell Wright (born 1979), American football player
Dawn Wright (born 1961), American geographer
Dean Wright (born 1962), American film director
DeAndre Wright (born 1986), American football player
Deborah Wright (born 1958), American corporate executive
Deil S. Wright (1930–2009), American political scientist
Delon Wright (born 1992), American basketball player
Demetrius Wright (born 1991), American football player
Denis Wright (1911–2005), British diplomat
Denis Wright (composer) (1895–1967), English composer
Dennis Wright (1919–1993), English footballer
Dennis H. Wright (1931–2020), English medical doctor and professor of pathology
Denny Wright (1924–1992), British guitarist
Derrick Wright (born 1928), British author
Destry Wright (born 1977), American football player
Dexter Russell Wright (1821–1886), American lawyer and politician
Diana Kingsmill Wright (1908–1982), Canadian journalist
Diaz Wright (born 1998), English footballer
Dizzy Wright (born 1990), American rapper
Dondre Wright (born 1994), Canadian football player
Dorell Wright (born 1985), American basketball player
Dorick M. Wright (1945–2020), Belizean prelate
Dorsey Wright (born 1957), American actor
Drew Wright (born 1979), Canadian singer
Drey Wright (born 1995), English footballer
Duncan Wright (born 1940), Australian rules footballer
Dunham Wright (1842–1942), American politician
Dunky Wright (1896–1976), Scottish runner
Dusty Wright (born 1957), American musician
Dwayne Wright (born 1983), American football player
Dwayne Wright (footballer) (born 1989), Caymanian footballer

E
Earl Wright (1948–2013), American singer-songwriter
Edgar Wright (born 1974), English film director
Edna Wright (1945–2020), American singer
Edythe Wright (1916–1965), American singer
Elias Wright (1830–1901), American army officer
Elissa Wright (born 1946), American politician
Elizur Wright (1804–1885), American mathematician and abolitionist
Ellen Riley Wright (1859–1904), English composer
Elliott Wright (born 1980), British television personality
Ellis Wright (1873–1940), English footballer
Elmo Wright (born 1949), American football player
E. M. Wright (1906–2005), British mathematician
Emma Wright (born 1996), Canadian water polo player
Emily Wright (born 1980), American songwriter
Ephraim M. Wright, American politician
Erik Olin Wright (1947–2019), American sociologist
Ernie Wright (1939–2007), American football player
Ernie Wright (footballer) (1912–?), English footballer
Ernest Hunter Wright (1882–1968), American professor
Esmond Wright (1915–2003), English historian
Esther Clark Wright (1895–1990), Canadian historian
Evan Wright (born 1966), American writer

F
Farnsworth Wright (1888–1940), American editor
Fearon Wright (born 1978), Jamaican American football player
Felix Wright (born 1959), American football player
Felton T. Wright (1900–1971), American football coach
Ferdinand von Wright (1822–1906), Finnish painter
Fielding L. Wright (1895–1956), American politician
Finbar Wright (born 1957), Irish singer-songwriter
Fiona Wright (born 1983), Australian poet
Flonzie Brown Wright (born 1942), American activist
Florence May Wright, American poet
Fortunatus Wright (1712–1757), British merchant
Frankie Wright (born 1985), American athlete
Franz Wright (1953–2015), American poet
Frazer Wright (born 1979), Scottish footballer

G
Gabe Wright (born 1992), American football player
Gabriella Wright (born 1982), English actress
Gareth Wright (born 1981), Welsh golfer
Garth Wright (born 1963), South African rugby union footballer
Garland Wright (born 1954), American admiral
Gavin Wright (born 1943), American economist and historian
Gavin Wright (cricketer) (born 1973), English cricketer
Gavyn Wright, British violinist
Gayle Wright (born 1951), American politician
Gearld Wright (1933–2002), American politician
Ged Wright (born 1976), American visual artist
Geoff Wright (1930–2011), English footballer
Geoff Wright (cricketer) (1929–2003), New Zealand cricketer
Geoffrey Wright (born 1959), Australian director
George F. Wright (1881–1938), American politician & engineer
Geraldine Wright, English neurotheologist
G. Ernest Wright (1909–1974), American archaeologist
Ghian Wright (born 1980), American music producer
Gillian Wright (born 1960), British actress
Gillian Wright (astronomer), Scottish astronomer
Ginny Wright (1933–2021), American singer
Glenn Wright (1901–1984), American baseball player
Graham Wright (born 1968), Australian rules footballer
Greg Wright (born 1979), English cricketer
G. S. Wright (1845–1935), Australian banker
Gunner Wright (born 1973), American actor
Gustavus Blin Wright (1830–1898), Canadian entrepreneur
G. V. Wright (born 1943), Irish politician
Gwendolyn Wright (born 1946), American historian

H
H. Wright (cricketer), New Zealand cricketer
Haji Wright (born 1998), American soccer player
Hamilton Wright (1867–1917), American physician
Hannah Amelia Wright (1836–1924), American physician
Hans Wright (1854–1925), Danish architect
Hardy Wright (1893–1974), Scottish greyhound trainer
Harriet G. R. Wright (1845–1928), American politician
Harvey Wright, Scottish rugby union footballer
H. E. Wright (1861–1897), English philatelist
Heather Wright (born 1950), English actress
Hector Wright (born 1969), Jamaican footballer
Hedley Wright (born 1953), English cricketer
Hendrick Bradley Wright (1808–1881), American politician
Helena Rosa Wright (1887–1982), English doctor
Henrietta Christian Wright (1852–1899), American author
Hercules Wright (1881–1963), New Zealand rugby union footballer
Herman Wright, American musician
Hiram A. Wright (1823–1855), American politician
H. Nelson Wright (1870–1941), Indian civil servant
Holly Wright (born 1941), American photographer
Hoover J. Wright (1928–2003), American football coach
Horace Kenton Wright (1915–1976), Bahamian artist
Horatio Wright (1820–1899), American general
Horatio George Anthony Wright (1827–1901), Australian surgeon
Hoss Wright, American drummer
Howard Wright (born 1967), American basketball player
Howie Wright (born 1947), American baseball player
Hugh Wright (born 1938), English schoolmaster
Hugh E. Wright (1879–1940), French actor
Humberston Wright (1876–1953), British actor
Huntley Wright (1868–1941), English actor
H. W. Wright, English cricketer
Hyman Wright, Jamaican record producer

I
Iain Wright (born 1972), British politician
Ichabod Charles Wright (1795–1871), English scholar
Imogen Wright, South African software developer
Irene Aloha Wright (1879–1972), American historian
Irving Wright (1882–1953), American tennis player
Isaac Wright (1760-1832), Quaker merchant
Isabella Wright (born 1997), American skier
Isaiah Wright (born 1997), American football player
Isom Wright (1859–1941), American politician
Izzy Wright (born 1990), Australian basketball player

J
Jacky Wright, British technology executive
Jacob L. Wright (born 1979), American author
Jacqueline Wright, English film director
Jaguar Wright (born 1977), American singer
Jaime Wright (1927–1999), Brazilian pastor
Jake Wright (born 1986), British football player
Jamey Wright (born 1974), American baseball player
Jamie Wright (born 1976), Canadian ice hockey player
Jan Wright, New Zealand politician
Janet Wright (1945–2016), Canadian actress
Janet Meik Wright (born 1946), American legal scholar
Janette Wright (born 1935), Scottish golfer
Jared Wright, American editor and cartoonist
Jaret Wright (born 1975), American baseball player
Jarvis T. Wright (1830–1886), American businessman and politician
J. Butler Wright (1877–1939), American diplomat
J. Craig Wright (1929–2010), American judge
Jean Elizabeth Geiger Wright (1924–2002), American conservationist
Jennifer Wright (born 1986), American author
Jenny Wright (born 1962), American actress
Jerauld Wright (1898–1995), American naval officer
Jeremy Wright (born 1972), English politician
Jeremiah Wright (born 1941), American pastor
Jermaine Wright (born 1975), English footballer
Jess Wright (born 1985), English television personality
J. J. Wright, American disc jockey
Joan Wright (1595–??), English witch
Joby Wright (born 1950), American basketball coach
Jocky Wright (1873–1946), Scottish footballer
Joel Wright (born 1980), Canadian football player
Joey Wright (born 1968), American basketball coach
John Kirtland Wright (1891–1969), American geographer
JoJo Wright, American radio personality
José Roberto Wright (born 1944), Brazilian football referee
Josephine Wright (born 1942), American musicologist
Josh Wright (born 1989), English footballer
Josh Wright (footballer, born 1988) (born 1988), English footballer
Joyce Wright (1922–2020), British singer and actress
J. Robert Wright (1936–2022), American priest
J. Skelly Wright (1911–1988), American judge
J. Stafford Wright (1905–1985), English theologian
Jules Wright (1948–2015), Australian theatre director
Jules Wright (politician) (1933–2022), American politician and businessman
Julia McNair Wright (1840–1903), American writer
Julia M. Wright (born 1964), Canadian academic
Julie Wright, American softball coach
June Wright (1919–2012), Australian writer
Junior Anthony Wright (born 1986), American boxer
Justin Wright (1981–2008), American artist
Justine Wright, New Zealand film editor

K
Kai Wright, American journalist
Kaleth O. Wright, American air force officer
Kalie Wright (born 1993), American model
Kat Wright, American singer-songwriter
Katharine Wright (1874–1929), American teacher
Katie Wright (born 1971), American actress
Katrina Wright (born 1981), Australian lawn bowler
Kelly Wright, American reporter
Kelvin Wright (born 1952), New Zealand bishop
Kendall Wright (born 1989), American football player
Kenie Wright (born 1997), American soccer player
Kenyatta Wright (born 1978), American football player
Kieran Wright (born 1999), Scottish footballer
Kirby Wright, American writer
Kit Wright (born 1944), English poet and author
K. J. Wright (born 1989), American football player
Kris Wright (born 1994), American racing driver
Kristy Wright (born 1978), Australian actress
Kurt Wright (born 1956), American politician
Kyle Wright (born 1984), American football player
Kyle Wright (baseball) (born 1995), American baseball player

L
Laurence Wright, American music composer
Laurence Wright (physician) (1590–1657), English physician
Lemuel Wellman Wright (1790–1886), American inventor
Len Wright (1906–1967), American politician and businessman
Lenoir C. Wright (1911–2003), American attorney
Leo Wright (1933–1991), American jazz musician
Leonard Wright (1555/1556–1591), English essayist
Leroy Wright (1938–2020), American basketball player
Lester Paul Wright (born 1946), British civil servant
Letitia Wright (born 1993), Guyanese-British actress
Levi Wright (1862–1953), English footballer and cricketer
Liam Wright (born 1997), Australian rugby union footballer
Lillian Mayfield Wright (1894–1986), American poet
Lillian Meighen Wright (1910–1993), Canadian philanthropist
Linda Wright (born 1950), British politician
Lindsey Wright (born 1979), Australian golfer
Liza Wright, American politician
Lizz Wright (born 1980), American singer
Lloyd Wright (1890–1978), American architect
Logan Wright (1933–1999), American psychologist
Lois Wright (born 1928), American artist
Lonnie Wright (1945–2019), American basketball player
Loren Wright (1917–2005), American basketball player
Lorenzen Wright (1975–2010), American basketball player
Lorenzo Wright (1926–1972), American athlete
Louisa Van Vleet Spicer Wright (1862–1913), American doctor
Lowell Wright (born 2003), Canadian soccer player
Loyd Wright (1892–1974), American attorney
L. R. Wright (1939–2001), Canadian writer
Lucilla Wright (born 1979), English field hockey player
Lucky Wright (1880–1941), American baseball player
Lucy Wright (1760–1821), American religious figure
Luther Wright (born 1971), former basketball player
L. W. Wright (born 1948/1949), American confidence trickster
Lyle Wright (1898–1963), Canadian-American ice hockey player
Lyndel Wright (born 1950), Jamaican cricketer
Lynn Wright (1952–2022), American politician

M
Mabel Osgood Wright (1859–1934), American author
Magnus von Wright (1805–1868), Swedish painter
Maia Wright (born 1997), Swedish singer-songwriter
Major Wright (born 1988), American football player
Malcolm Wright (1926–1996), Sri Lankan cricketer
Mandy Wright (born 1977), American politician
Manuel Wright (born 1984), American football player
Marc Wright (1890–1975), American pole vaulter
Marcellus E. Wright Sr. (1881–1962), American architect
Margie Wright (born 1952), American softball coach
Marion Thompson Wright (1902–1962), American activist
Marquis Wright (born 1995), American basketball player
Mars Wright (born 1995), American fashion designer
Martine Wright (born 1972), American volleyball player
Marva Wright (1948–2010), American singer
Mat Wright (1858–1949), English cricketer
Mathew Wright (born 1988), New Zealand rugby union footballer
Matice Wright (born 1965), American naval officer
Maureen Wright (born 1939), Australian athlete
Mauricio Wright (born 1970), Costa Rican footballer
McKinley Wright IV (born 1998), American basketball player
Megan Wright (born 1981), Canadian runner
Mel Wright (1928–1983), American baseball player
Micah Wright (born 1974), American writer
Michelle Wright (born 1961), Canadian singer
Mickey Wright (1935–2020), American golfer
Miriamm Wright (born 1971), American singer-songwriter
Moira von Wright (born 1957), Finnish-Swedish academic
Monty Wright (1931–2012), English footballer
Monty Wright (boxer) (born 1969), British boxer
Morton Wright (1914–1940), Australian rules footballer
Moses Wright (born 1998), American basketball player
Mother Wright (1921–2009), American activist
Muriel H. Wright (1889–1975), American author and historian
Murray Wright, New Zealand rugby league footballer
Mykael Wright (born 2000), American football player
Myles Wright (born 1996), English footballer
Myron Benjamin Wright (1847–1894), American politician

N
Nahshon Wright (born 1998), American football player
Nancy Wright (1917–1994), Welsh golfer
Nancy Young Wright, American politician
Nanine Wright (1876–1974), American actress
Nannie Kelly Wright (1856–1946), American ironmaster
Nannie Louise Wright (1879–1958), American composer
Narcissa Wright (born 1989), American speedrunner
Nate Wright (born 1947), American football player
Nathaniel Wright (1785–1858), American businessman and politician
N'Bushe Wright (born 1969), American actress
Neville Wright (born 1980), Canadian bobsledder
Niall Wright (born 1991), Northern Irish actor
Nicci Wright (born 1972), Canadian footballer
Niel Wright (born 1933), New Zealand poet
Norma Jean Wright (born 1956), American singer
Norman Wright (1908–1974), English footballer
Sir Norman Wright (1900–1970), British chemist
N. T. Wright (born 1948), English theologian

O
Olgivanna Lloyd Wright (1898–1985), Montenegrin-American dancer
Olivia Wright (born 1990), Australian diver
Ollie Wright (born 1999), English footballer
Orville Wright (1871–1948), American airplane inventor
Oswald Wright (1877–1933), English cricketer
Otis D. Wright II (born 1944), American judge
O. V. Wright (1939–1980), American singer
Ozzie Wright (born 1976), Australian surfer

P
Pamela Wright (born 1964), Scottish golfer
Patience Wright (1725–1786), English-American sculptor
Patrisha Wright (born 1949), American activist
Pearce Wright (1933–2005), British journalist
Percy Wright (1892–1980), American politician
Peter Wright (1916-1995), British counter-intelligence agent
Philemon Wright (1760–1839), Canadian farmer
Prescott Wright (1935–2006), American film producer
Priscilla Wright (born 1940), Canadian singer

Q
Quincy Wright (1890–1970), American political scientist

R
Randall Wright (born 1956), Canadian economist
Randy Wright (born 1961), American football player
Rashad Wright (born 1982), American basketball player
Rasheim Wright (born 1981), American-Jordanian basketball player
Ray Wright (1918–1987), English footballer
Rebecca Wright (1947–2006), American ballet teacher
Rebecca N. Wright (born 1967), American computer scientist
Reg Wright (1905–1990), Australian politician
Reg Wright (footballer) (1901–1973), English footballer
Richard Wright (musician) (1943–2008), Member of Pink Floyd
R. L. Wright, American pastor
Rodney Wright (born 1979), American football player
Rodney Wright (Australian footballer) (born 1960), Australian rules footballer
Rodrique Wright (born 1984), American football player
Rogers H. Wright (1927–2013), American psychologist
Rosemarie Wright (1931–2020), English pianist
Ross Wright (born 1952), Australian rules footballer
Ross Wright (rugby union) (born 1986), New Zealand rugby union footballer
Rowland Wright (1915–1991), British industrialist
Royston Wright (1908–1977), English naval officer
Ruben Wright, American musician
Rufus Wright, English actor
Ruggles Wright (1793–1863), Canadian lumber merchant
Rumatiki Ruth Wright (1908–1982), New Zealand politician
Russel Wright (1904–1976), American industrial designer
Russell Francis Wright (1920–2012), Australian radio engineer
Rusty Wright, American football coach
Ryan Wright (rugby league) (born 1991), English rugby league footballer
Ryan Wright (American football) (born 2000), American football player

S
Samson Wright (1899–1956), British physiologist
Samuel E. Wright (1946–2021), American actor and singer
Sara Wright (born 1969), Bermudian sailor
Scooby Wright (born 1994), American football player
Seaborn Wright, American politician
Selwyn Wright (1934–2015), English physicist
Sewall Wright (1889–1988), American biologist
S. Fowler Wright (1874–1965), English writer
Shannon Wright, American singer-songwriter
Shannon Wright (illustrator) (born 1994), American cartoonist
Shareece Wright (born 1987), American football player
Shaun Wright (born 1968), British politician
Sheena Wright (born 1970), American corporate executive
Sheila Wright (1925–2013), British politician
Shereka Wright (born 1981), American basketball player
Silas Wright (1795–1847), American politician
Smithson E. Wright (1807–1881), American politician
Specs Wright (1927–1963), American drummer
Susanna Wright (1697–1784), English poet
Susannah Wright (1792–??), English publisher
Susanne Wright, Austrian author
Syd Wright (1882–1952), Australian rules footballer
Sydney Edward Wright (1914–1966), Australian academic
Sylvester Wright (born 1971), American football player
Syreeta Wright (1946–2004), American singer-songwriter

T
Taffy Wright (1911–1981), American baseball player
Tandi Wright (born 1970), New Zealand actress
Tanisha Wright (born 1983), American basketball coach
Tanya Wright (born 1971), American entrepreneur
Ted Wright (1913–1983), American football player
Tenny Wright (1885–1971), American film director
Teresa Wright (1918–2005), American actress
Timothy Wright (1947–2009), American singer and pastor
T. J. Wright (born 1983), American football player
T. M. Wright (1947–2015), American writer
Toby Wright, American record producer
Toby Wright (American football) (born 1970), American football player
Todd Wright, American sports broadcaster
Todd Wright (musician), American music composer
Toki Wright (born 1980), American rapper
Tracy Wright (1959–2010), Canadian actress
TrayVonn Wright (born 1991), American basketball player
Tremaine Wright (born 1972), American politician
Trevor Wright (born 1980), American actor
Tricia Wright (born 1958), English darts player
Turbutt Wright (1741–1783), American planter and politician
Tyler Wright (born 1994), Canadian ice hockey player
Tyler Wright (surfer) (born 1994), Australian surfer
Tyreik Wright (born 2001), Irish footballer

V
Van Earl Wright (born 1962), American sportscaster
Verle Wright Jr. (1928–2012), American sports shooter
Vern Wright (1900–1978), Australian rules footballer
Verna Wright (1928–1998), British physician
Vic Wright (1909–1964), English footballer
Vicky Wright (born 1993), Scottish curler
Victoria Wright (born 1976), French badminton player
Vim Wright (1926–2003), Turkish-American entrepreneur
Vince Wright (1931–2004), English footballer
Virginia Wright (art collector) (1929–2020), American art collector

W
Waller Rodwell Wright (1775–1826), English judge
Warwick Wright (born 1946), New Zealand field hockey player
Webster Wright (born 1967), American sports shooter
Wendy Wright, American activist
Wesley Wright (born 1985), American baseball player
Whitaker Wright (1846–1904), English businessman
Whittni Wright (born 1987), American actress
Wilbur Wright (1867–1912), American inventor
Wilhelmina Wright (born 1964), American judge
Wilhelm von Wright (1810–1887), Swedish-Finnish painter
Wilmer Cave Wright (1868–1951), British-American philologist
Winifred Grace Wright (1891–1978), English chemist
Winky Wright (born 1971), American boxer
Winston Wright (1943–1993), Jamaican keyboardist

Y
Ysabel Wright (1885–1960), Cuban-American botanist
Yvonne Wright (1951–2016), American songwriter

Z
Zach Wright (born 1995), American soccer player
Zack Wright (born 1985), Bosnian-American basketball player
Zain Wright (born 1979), Australian field hockey player
Zara Wright, American author
Zion Wright (born 1999), American skateboarder
Zollie Wright (1909–1976), American baseball player

Disambiguation pages

A
Aaron Wright (disambiguation)
Adam Wright (disambiguation)
Al Wright (disambiguation)
Alan Wright (disambiguation)
Albert Wright (disambiguation)
Alexander Wright (disambiguation)
Alice Wright (disambiguation)
Alison Wright (disambiguation)
Amy Wright (disambiguation)
Andrew Wright (disambiguation)
Andy Wright (disambiguation)
Angus Wright (disambiguation)
Anne Wright (disambiguation)
Anthony Wright (disambiguation)
Antoine Wright (disambiguation)
A. R. Wright (disambiguation)
Archibald Wright (disambiguation)
Arthur Wright (disambiguation)
Ashley Wright (disambiguation)
Austin Wright (disambiguation)

B
Barbara Wright (disambiguation)
Belinda Wright (disambiguation)
Ben Wright (disambiguation)
Benjamin Wright (disambiguation)
Bert Wright (disambiguation)
Billy Wright (disambiguation)
Bobby Wright (disambiguation)
Brad Wright (disambiguation)
Brian Wright (disambiguation)
Bruce Wright (disambiguation)

C
Cameron Wright (disambiguation)
Carl Wright (disambiguation)
Carol Wright (disambiguation)
Carolyn Wright (disambiguation)
Charles Wright (disambiguation)
Chase Wright (disambiguation)
Chester Wright (disambiguation)
Chris Wright (disambiguation)
Christopher Wright (disambiguation)
Claire Wright (disambiguation)
Cliff Wright (disambiguation)
Clifford Wright (disambiguation)
Craig Wright (disambiguation)
Cyril Wright (disambiguation)

D
Dale Wright (disambiguation)
Daniel Wright (disambiguation)
Danny Wright (disambiguation)
Darren Wright (disambiguation)
David Wright (disambiguation)
Dick Wright (disambiguation)
Don Wright (disambiguation)
Donald Wright (disambiguation)
Doug Wright (disambiguation)
Douglas Wright (disambiguation)

E
Ed Wright (disambiguation)
Edmund Wright (disambiguation)
Edward Wright (disambiguation)
Edwin Wright (disambiguation)
Elizabeth Wright (disambiguation)
Eric Wright (disambiguation)
Ernest Wright (disambiguation)
Ethel Wright (disambiguation)
Eugene Wright (disambiguation)

F
Frances Wright (disambiguation)
Francis Wright (disambiguation)
Frank Wright (disambiguation)
Fred Wright (disambiguation)
Frederick Wright (disambiguation)

G
Gary Wright (disambiguation)
George Wright (disambiguation)
Gerald Wright (disambiguation)
Gerry Wright (disambiguation)
Gilbert Wright (disambiguation)
Gordon Wright (disambiguation)
Gregory Wright (disambiguation)

H
Harold Wright (disambiguation)
Harry Wright (disambiguation)
Helen Wright (disambiguation)
Henry Wright (disambiguation)
Herbert Wright (disambiguation)

I
Ian Wright (disambiguation)
Isaac Wright (disambiguation)

J
Jack Wright (disambiguation)
Jackie Wright (disambiguation)
James Wright (disambiguation)
Jane Wright (disambiguation)
Jason Wright (disambiguation)
Jay Wright (disambiguation)
Jeffrey Wright (disambiguation)
Jerry Wright (disambiguation)
Jessica Wright (disambiguation)
Jim Wright (disambiguation)
Jimmy Wright (disambiguation)
Joe Wright (disambiguation)
John Wright (disambiguation)
Jon Wright (disambiguation)
Jonathan Wright (disambiguation)
Jordan Wright (disambiguation)
Joseph Wright (disambiguation)
Joshua Wright (disambiguation)
Judith Wright (disambiguation)
Julian Wright (disambiguation)

K
Katherine Wright (disambiguation)
Keith Wright (disambiguation)
Kenneth Wright (disambiguation)
Kevin Wright (disambiguation)

L
Lammar Wright (disambiguation)
Larry Wright (disambiguation)
Lawrence Wright (disambiguation)
Laura Wright (disambiguation)
Lee Wright (disambiguation)
Leslie Wright (disambiguation)
Louis Wright (disambiguation)
Louise Wright (disambiguation)
Luke Wright (disambiguation)

M
Mac Wright (disambiguation)
Marcus Wright (disambiguation)
Margaret Wright (disambiguation)
Marie Wright (disambiguation)
Mark Wright (disambiguation)
Marshall Wright (disambiguation)
Martha Wright (disambiguation)
Martin Wright (disambiguation)
Mary Wright (disambiguation)
Mary Ann Wright (disambiguation)
Matthew Wright (disambiguation)
Max Wright (disambiguation)
Michael Wright (disambiguation)
Milton Wright (disambiguation)
Molly Wright (disambiguation)

N
Nathan Wright (disambiguation)
Nicholas Wright (disambiguation)
Nigel Wright (disambiguation)

O
Oliver Wright (disambiguation)
Owen Wright (disambiguation)

P
Patricia Wright (disambiguation)
Patrick Wright (disambiguation)
Paul Wright (disambiguation)
Peter Wright (disambiguation)
Philip Wright (disambiguation)

R
Ralph Wright (disambiguation)
Rasty Wright (disambiguation)
Raymond Wright (disambiguation)
Richard Wright (disambiguation)
Ricky Wright (disambiguation)
Rita Wright (disambiguation)
Robert Wright (disambiguation)
Robin Wright (disambiguation)
Rod Wright (disambiguation)
Roger Wright (disambiguation)
Ronald Wright (disambiguation)
Roy Wright (disambiguation)
Ruby Wright (disambiguation)

S
Samuel Wright (disambiguation)
Sarah Wright (disambiguation)
Scott Wright (disambiguation)
Shane Wright (disambiguation)
Simon Wright (disambiguation)
Sophie Wright (disambiguation)
Stan Wright (disambiguation)
Stephen Wright (disambiguation)
Steven Wright (disambiguation)
Stuart Wright (disambiguation)
Susan Wright (disambiguation)

T
Terry Wright (disambiguation)
Theodore Wright (disambiguation)
Thomas Wright (disambiguation)
Tim Wright (disambiguation)
Tom Wright (disambiguation)
Tommy Wright (disambiguation)
Tony Wright (disambiguation)

W
Wallace Wright (disambiguation)
Walter Wright (disambiguation)
Warren Wright (disambiguation)
Wayne Wright (disambiguation)
William Wright (disambiguation)
Willie Wright (disambiguation)

Fictional characters
Honey Wright, a character on the drama series Casualty
May Wright, a character on the soap opera EastEnders
Phoenix Wright, a character in the video game series Ace Attorney
Nate Wright, the main character of the comic strip Big Nate

See also
Cartwright (disambiguation), a disambiguation page for "Cartwright"
Wainwright (disambiguation), a disambiguation page for "Wainwright"
Wheelwright (disambiguation), a disambiguation page for "Wheelright"
Wright (disambiguation), a disambiguation page for "Wright"
Admiral Wright (disambiguation), a disambiguation page for Admirals surnamed "Wright"
Attorney General Wright (disambiguation), a disambiguation page for Attorney Generals surnamed "Wright"
General Wright (disambiguation), a disambiguation page for Generals surnamed "Wright"
Governor Wright (disambiguation), a disambiguation page for Governors surnamed "Wright"
Judge Wright (disambiguation), a disambiguation page for Judges surnamed "Wright"
Justice Wright (disambiguation), a disambiguation page for Justices surnamed "Wright"
Lord Wright (disambiguation), a disambiguation page for Lords surnamed "Wright"
Senator Wright (disambiguation), a disambiguation page for Senators surnamed "Wright"

References 

Occupational surnames
English-language surnames
Surnames of English origin
English-language occupational surnames